Mangala Sharma (born 1969) is a Bhutanese human and women's rights activist, the first winner of the Ginetta Sagan Fund Award in 1997. Born in Tsirang, she was exiled from the country in March 1992 after being outspoken against the government's "One Nation, One People policy and discrimination against ethnic minorities, known as Lhotshampas. Since, she has formed the Bhutanese Refugees Aid for Victims of Violence (BRAVE), a self-help organization dedicated to assisting affected refugees from Bhutan. BRAVE facilitates counseling and training in all eight of the Bhutanese refugee camps in Nepal. In 1995 sharma took some of the women refugees to Beijing in China to the International Women Conference. There she could get the help United States Government, United Nations and Australian Government.

Sharma was granted asylum and moved to the United States in 2000 and began working for the Refugee Women Network based in Georgia. She moved to Roseville, Minnesota, US in November 2007, where she has started the Nirvana Center to assist resettled families.

References
Notes

Citations

1969 births
Living people
Bhutanese human rights activists
Women's rights activists
People from Tsirang District
Bhutanese people of Nepalese descent
Bhutanese emigrants to the United States
People from Roseville, Minnesota